Georgios Kontogouris (born 8 July 1980) is a Greek sailor. He competed in the Star event at the 2004 Summer Olympics.

References

External links
 

1980 births
Living people
Greek male sailors (sport)
Olympic sailors of Greece
Sailors at the 2004 Summer Olympics – Star
Place of birth missing (living people)